Mollenkamp is a surname. Notable people with the surname include:

Aida Mollenkamp (born 1980), American chef, television personality and food writer
Fred Mollenkamp (1890–1948), American baseball player
Thomas Möllenkamp (born 1961), German rower
Wilhelm Möllenkamp (1858–1917), German entomologist